Turkish Croatia was a geopolitical term which appeared periodically during the Ottoman–Habsburg wars between the late 16th to late 18th century. Invented by Austrian military cartographers, it referred to a border area of Bosnia located across the Ottoman-Austrian border from the Croatian Military Frontier. It went out of use with the Austro-Hungarian rule in Bosnia and Herzegovina.

Location

The name was used on the region of Bosanska Krajina (Krajina = ; in Medieval Bosnia it was known as Donji Kraji and Zapadne Strane). This territory was usually depicted as roughly comprising the land area between the river Vrbas in the east, the Sava in the northeast, the Una in the northwest, as well as Dinara mountain in the south, including the Cazinska krajina pocket in the far west. Parts of Lika, Banovina and northern Dalmatia (now in Croatia) were also mapped as part of "Turkish Croatia" when Ottoman borders went further west.

History

The term was invented by the Austro-Hungarian Armed Forces military cartographers, who worked for the Austrian-Ottoman Border Commission, set up by peace treaties from 1699 (Treaty of Karlowitz) and 1718 (Treaty of Požarevac), and consisted of number of Austrians, Venetians and one Croat (Vitezović). It was used more consistently immediately afterwards in maps produced for the part of the territory in present-day Bosnia and Herzegovina.

In Austro-Hungarian military maps from the 16th to 19th century, the so-called "Turkish Croatia" appeared as a borderland in the Croatian Military Frontier, whose Habsburg-controlled side, in present-day Croatia, was administered directly from Vienna's military headquarters. The term was similar as other borderland terms such as Morlacchia and Terrae desertae.

The term started appearing in colloquial usage among some Austria-Hungarian military and political mapmakers, in correlation to Ottoman retreat and Austria-Hungarian expansion, and subsequently it was produced in military and geostrategic maps. Croatian historian Mladen Ančić has referred to the term within the description of how medieval political and cultural boundaries were destroyed by the Ottoman wars and the establishment of early modern frontiers.

All these various borderland terms vanished by the end of the 18th century or by the beginning of the 19th century, with the change of the complex circumstances that had created them.

In the 19th century, following the conclusion of the Ottoman–Habsburg wars, and the transfer of power in the Bosnia Vilayet from Ottomans to Habsburg rule at the Berlin Congress in 1878, the term became redundant, as it no longer served its purpose, and disappeared from official usage completely. The entire territory of Bosnia and Herzegovina came under a direct rule of the Viennese government, and since 1908 annexation (Bosnian Crisis) became a new Crown land, thus making a term irrelevant in the eyes of its originators.

From maps it found its way into narrative, peculiar to Croatian national revival movement, based on a paraphrase of so-called hrvatske "matere zemlje" and "hrvatsko državno pravo" (similar to one in Serbia with an expression "Srpske zemlje"), which is at the time propagated by political organization called Party of Rights. It was typically exploited for the geopolitical purpose and utterance of territorial ambitions and expansionist aspirations of both Austria-Hungary and later Croatia, via transposition of these "rights" on Bosnia and Herzegovina and its historic territory.

Maps

Legacy

Although on rare occasions, the term was also used in romanticized historiography, as well as in the phantasmagoric politics of "National awakening" and "National integration and homogenization" of the Croatia of the late 19th to early 20th century.

In more recent times, with a rise of Franjo Tuđman and establishment of the Republic of Croatia in the 1990s, the term was revived in reference to the political and military aims that Tuđman and his close associates had in Bosnia and Herzegovina, wanting to control both the area of former Banovina of Croatia as well as the adjacent Una-Sana regions of Bosanska Krajina. Tuđman was widely criticized, among the Bosniaks, by the Croatian intelligentsia and in the international community, for his public discussions of this matter and giving it legitimacy, and was subsequently accused of encouraging a forceful partition of Bosnia and Herzegovina. Encouraged with Tuđman's usage of the term as a mean to denigrate and devalue Bosnia and Herzegovina sovereignty and statehood, the term was adopted as part of Croatian far-right nationalist narrative and, although sparsely, as part of their official political discourse, however with little if any impact on mainstream international geopolitics, political geography and historiography, or on academic research for that matter. The term never took hold outside the scope of Croatian political extremism and academic fringes.

References to 'Turkish Croatia' in modern-day Croatian scholarly works include discussions of a lack of an actually centrally positioned geographical space in Croatia since the 15th century.

See also
 Croatization
 Ottoman conquest of Bosnia and Herzegovina
 Bosnia Eyalet
 Ottoman period in the history of Croatia

References

External links
 Fortresses in Turkish Croatia /page 56/ (in German)
 Geology books on Turkish Croatia from the 19th century (in Croatian)
 Cover of the August Kaznačić book „Bosnia, Herzegovina and Turkish Croatia“ from 1862 (in Italian)

Ottoman period in the history of Croatia
Ottoman period in the history of Bosnia and Herzegovina
Croatian nationalism
Pan-nationalism
Croatian irredentism
Political terminology of Croatia